The 1967 Major League Baseball season was contested from April 10 to October 12, 1967. The St. Louis Cardinals defeated the Boston Red Sox four games to three in the World Series, which was the first World Series appearance for the Red Sox in 21 years.  Following the season, the Kansas City Athletics relocated to Oakland.

The season was filled with historic seasons from multiple players. Carl Yastrzemski of the Boston Red Sox had tied for the most home runs in MLB with Harmon Killebrew, giving him the elusive triple crown. He led the American League in batting average (.326), home runs due to the tie with Killebrew (44) and runs batted in (121) (This feat would not be accomplished again until Miguel Cabrera earned the triple crown in 2012 with the Detroit Tigers). Yastrzemski also won the AL MVP and led the Red Sox to the AL pennant for the first time in two decades. They would ultimately lose to the St. Louis Cardinals 7–2 in Game 7 of the World Series.

The Cardinals had standout players as well, with first baseman Orlando Cepeda becoming the first unanimously voted NL MVP. Cepeda finished the season with 25 home runs, 111 RBIs and a .325 batting average. He did however, struggle in the World Series, hitting only .103 with one RBI.

Awards and honors

Baseball Hall of Fame
Branch Rickey
Red Ruffing
Lloyd Waner
Most Valuable Player
Carl Yastrzemski, Boston Red Sox, OF (AL) 
Orlando Cepeda, St. Louis Cardinals, 1B (NL)
Cy Young Award
Jim Lonborg, Boston Red Sox
Mike McCormick, San Francisco Giants
Rookie of the Year 
Rod Carew, Minnesota Twins, 2B (AL)
Tom Seaver, New York Mets, SP (NL)
Gold Glove Award
George Scott (1B) (AL) 
Bobby Knoop (2B) (AL) 
Brooks Robinson (3B) (AL) 
Jim Fregosi (SS) (AL) 
Paul Blair (OF) (AL) 
Al Kaline (OF) (AL) 
Carl Yastrzemski (OF) (AL)
Bill Freehan (C) (AL) 
Jim Kaat (P) (AL)

MLB statistical leaders

1 American League Triple Crown Batting Winner

Standings

American League

National League

Postseason

Bracket

Home Field Attendance

Other
April 21 – The Los Angeles Dodgers run of 737 consecutive games without a game being rained out ends.
May 14 - Mickey Mantle hit his 500th home run at Yankee Stadium.
October 18, 1967: City officials from Kansas City, Oakland and Seattle were invited by Joe Cronin to discuss the A's relocation plans. United States Senator Stuart Symington attended the meeting and discussed the possibility of revoking baseball's antitrust exemption if the A's were allowed to leave Kansas City. The owners began deliberation and after the first ballot, only six owners were in favor of relocation. The owner of Baltimore voted against, while the ownership for Cleveland, New York and Washington had abstained. In the second ballot, the New York Yankees voted in favor of the Athletics relocation to Oakland. To appease all interested parties, the Athletics announced that MLB would expand to Kansas City and Seattle no later than the 1971 MLB season. MLB owners, bowing to Symington's threat, awarded Kansas City and Seattle expansion American League franchises for the 1969 season.

See also
1967 Nippon Professional Baseball season

References

External links
1967 Major League Baseball season schedule

 
Major League Baseball seasons